Paddy Kelly (8 February 1896 – 30 October 1970) was an  Australian rules footballer who played with St Kilda in the Victorian Football League (VFL).

Notes

External links 

1896 births
1970 deaths
Australian rules footballers from New South Wales
St Kilda Football Club players
Paddington Australian Football Club players